The 1974 Western Michigan Broncos football team represented Western Michigan University in the Mid-American Conference (MAC) during the 1974 NCAA Division I football season.  In their 11th season under head coach Bill Doolittle, the Broncos compiled a 3–8 record (0–5 against MAC opponents), finished in sixth place in the MAC, and were outscored by their opponents, 269 to 187.  The team played its home games at Waldo Stadium in Kalamazoo, Michigan.

The team's statistical leaders included Paul Jorgensen with 701 passing yards, Dan Matthews with 769 rushing yards, and Greg Cowser with 403 receiving yards. Tight end Greg Crowser and quarterback Paul Jorgensen were the team captains. Halfback Dan Matthews received the team's most outstanding player award.

On November 18, 1974, after "mounting pressure" for a change in the school's football coach, Doolittle resigned.  In 11 years as head coach, Doolittle compiled a 58–49–2 record at Western Michigan.

Schedule

See also
 1974 in Michigan

References

Western Michigan
Western Michigan Broncos football seasons
Western Michigan Broncos football